Most countries with military aviation forces have a system for naming of military airbases.  "Air Force Base" ("AFB") is part of the name of military airbases of the United States Air Force (USAF) and the South African Air Force (SAAF), with the USAF using it at the end of the name of the base (e.g. "Dover AFB"), and the SAAF using it at the start (e.g. "AFB Hoedspruit"). The Royal Australian Air Force uses a slightly different format referring to bases as "RAAF Base" (Royal Australian Air Force Base).  The Canadian Forces also uses a different format referring to any base as "CFB" (Canadian Forces Base) or "BFC" in French (Base des Forces Canadiennes).

Naming of British airbases

The Royal Air Force (RAF) call their bases "Royal Air Force station", followed by the station name.  This is often abbreviated into "RAF" plus the name, e.g. RAF Marham.  They are generally named after the closest railway station as rail travel was the main means of transport for service personnel in the early days of the RAF. Many RAF stations have long since lost their local railway station. Other bases were named after the local village, or used the name of the building in which they resided, such as RAF Bentley Priory, or country (e.g. RAF Belize).  There is no difference in nomenclature for non-flying RAF stations, and overseas RAF stations have followed the same principles.

The aviation division of the Royal Navy, the Fleet Air Arm (FAA) generally follow the same principles of naming as the RAF, but are instead prefixed with Royal Naval Air Station (RNAS), such as RNAS Yeovilton.  However, in maintaining the maritime link, all Royal Navy air stations are additionally named in the same manner as the Navy's ships - in Yeoviltons' instance, it is also called HMS Heron.

The British Army Air Corps have previously used the term "Airfield", preceded by the local name, for example Wattisham Airfield.  However, as the majority of current Army airfields are former RAF stations, they now precede the locality name with "Army Air Corps" (AAC), for example AAC Middle Wallop.

Naming of United States airbases
United States Air Force bases are often but not always named after a person of military or governmental significance. Examples include Edwards Air Force Base, Selfridge Air National Guard Base and General Mitchell Air Reserve Base. Sometimes bases are named after a nearby city. Examples include Little Rock Air Force Base, Dover Air Force Base, and Los Angeles Air Force Base. Air Force Station is usually used in the name of those with very little or no flight activity, although there are cases where installations with no flight activity use the term Base instead of Station (e.g., Bolling Air Force Base). USAF bases located in other countries are usually named after the city or region where they're located and are referred to as Air Bases rather than Air Force Bases (e.g. Spangdahlem Air Base in Germany).

The United States Army call their air bases Army Airfields and like the Air Force, names most of them after a military or government figure (e.g. Biggs Army Airfield). Some Army Airfields are named for the Army base where they're located as well (e.g. Polk Army Airfield, located at Fort Polk in Louisiana). The Army also has Army Heliports such as Hanchey Army Heliport. As titled, these airfields are used by helicopters only.

The United States Navy, United States Marine Corps, and United States Coast Guard generally prefer to name their bases for the area where they're located (e.g. Pensacola Naval Air Station, Cherry Point Marine Corps Air Station and Coast Guard Air Station Elizabeth City). This is also to avoid longer names given by the pilots if names of persons are added. The Navy also operates a number of Naval Outlying Landing Fields, auxiliary air fields primarily used for flight training purposes.

There are also a number of joint air bases throughout the U.S. These bases are owned & operated by one particular military component (usually the US Navy or US Air Force) and will have other military units (and sometimes non-military governmental air units) garrisoned at the base. Examples include Naval Air Station Joint Reserve Base New Orleans, Minneapolis–Saint Paul Joint Air Reserve Station, and Naval Air Station Joint Reserve Base Fort Worth.

References

Military airbases
Military air bases